Oluwadamilola Bakare known as Dami Bakare (born 22 September 1988) is a British volleyball player. Born in Kaduna, Nigeria, he competed for Great Britain in the men's tournament at the 2012 Summer Olympics.

Early life
Born in Nigeria, Bakara moved to London at the age of one. Bakare began playing volleyball in school after originally playing basketball.

Career
He progressed through Great Britain's men's development squad and later played internationally at the London International Invitational Tournament, part of the London Prepares series, where he was the competition's top scorer. He played professionally with Belgian club VC Argex Duvel Puurs.

He was selected for Great Britain's 2012 Olympic squad. Following the tournament, he played in Korea.

Personal life
Bakare enjoys photography and fashion design. He trained as a dentist. His cousin Peter was also a member of the 2012 Olympic squad.

References

British men's volleyball players
Volleyball players at the 2012 Summer Olympics
Olympic volleyball players of Great Britain
1988 births
Living people
Sportspeople from Kaduna
Nigerian emigrants to the United Kingdom